James Lawrence Isherwood (1917–1989) was an English artist, born in Wigan, Lancashire. He often painted subject and images (landscapes, seascapes, and portraits) from the Wigan area in a style that became known as 'Wigan style'. His style has been described as Impressionist/Expressionist.

Isherwood was a friend of the artist L. S. Lowry, who purchased his Woman with Black Cat and displayed it at his home.

A BBC documentary, I am Isherwood was made in 1974 about the artist and his work. This was transmitted twice by the BBC, once in 1974 and again in 1975.

Isherwood died in 1989.

Collections
Isherwood's work is represented in the permanent collections of the Hereford Museum and Art Gallery, the Warrington Museum and Art Gallery, the Salford Museum and Art Gallery, among other venues.

References

External links 
 http://www.isherwoodart.co.uk/ James Lawrence Isherwood art and Works for sale 
 http://www.artbyisherwood.co.uk The official Isherwood website

1917 births
1989 deaths
20th-century English painters
English male painters
Landscape artists
Modern painters
Naïve painters
People from Wigan
20th-century English male artists